Capsula fibrosa may refer to:

 Fibrous capsule of Glisson (capsula fibrosa renis)
 Renal capsule (capsula fibrosa perivascularis)